David Adam may refer to:

David Adam (priest) (1936–2020), English minister and canon of York Minster
David Adam (diplomat) (born 1941), Canadian diplomat

See also
David Adams (disambiguation)